is a Japanese snowboarder. She has represented Japan at the 2010 Winter Olympics in Vancouver and the 2014 Winter Olympics in Sochi.

References

1991 births
Snowboarders at the 2010 Winter Olympics
Snowboarders at the 2014 Winter Olympics
Living people
Olympic snowboarders of Japan
Japanese female snowboarders
Place of birth missing (living people)
21st-century Japanese women